This is the list of episodes for Late Night with Seth Meyers in 2020. From March 30–August 20, Meyers began filming at home editions due to the COVID-19 pandemic in the United States.

2020

January

February

March

April

May

June

July

August

September

October

November

December

References

External links
 
 Lineups at Interbridge 

Episodes
Lists of American non-fiction television series episodes
Lists of variety television series episodes